Sanval, is a village in Gujarat in western India.

The village has one primary school. Ramji Mandir is a temple in the village.

References 

Villages in Banaskantha district